Chester Arthur Williams (May 25, 1906 – December 25, 1952) was an American Negro league shortstop for several teams between 1931 and 1943.

A native of Beaumont, Texas, Williams was selected for the East–West All-Star Game in each season from 1934 to 1937, and went 3-for-4 with a double in the 1934 game. He died in Lake Charles, Louisiana in 1952 at age 46.

References

External links
 and Baseball-Reference Black Baseball stats and Seamheads
 Chet Williams at Negro Leagues Baseball Museum

1906 births
1952 deaths
Chicago American Giants players
Homestead Grays players
Indianapolis ABCs (1931–1933) players
Memphis Red Sox players
Philadelphia Stars players
Pittsburgh Crawfords players
Baseball shortstops
Baseball players from Texas
Sportspeople from Beaumont, Texas
20th-century African-American sportspeople